Black cow  or Black Cow can refer to:

 A root beer float
Black Cow Vodka, a brand of vodka made from whey, a byproduct of cheesemaking
 "Black Cow", a song on Steely Dan's 1977 album Aja

See also
 Black Bull (disambiguation)